Protschenberg (Sorbian Hrodźiško) is a mountain of Saxony, southeastern Germany.

References

Mountains of Saxony